DWEC (1062 AM) Environment Radio is a radio station owned and operated by Puerto Princesa Broadcasting Corporation. Its studios and transmitter are located at Mitra Rd., Brgy. Sta. Monica, Puerto Princesa City.

References

External links
Environment Radio FB Page

Radio stations in Puerto Princesa
Radio stations established in 2002